Lucy Gordon (22 May 1980 – 20 May 2009) was an English actress and model. She became a face of CoverGirl in 1997 before starting an acting career. Her first film was Perfume in 2001 before going on to have small roles in Spider-Man 3, Serendipity and The Four Feathers. Gordon had played the actress and singer Jane Birkin in the film Gainsbourg, a biopic of singer-songwriter Serge Gainsbourg. Before the film was released, she hanged herself in her flat in Paris on 20 May 2009.

Early life
Gordon was born in Oxford, to Richard and Susan Gordon in 1980; she had a younger sister, Kate. She went to Oxford High School where she passed nine GCSEs in 1997. She moved to Paris after living in New York for several years.

Career
While in the fourth form of Oxford High School she was noticed by a talent-spotter from a modelling agency as she and her mother visited a Clothes Show Live exhibition. She went on to appear as one of the faces of CoverGirl and soon after she moved into acting. She was signed to Select modelling agency in London and had appeared in the covers of Italian Glamour and Elle.

Gordon made her film debut in the 2001 as the character Sarah in Perfume. She appeared alongside Heath Ledger in the 2002 film The Four Feathers. She appeared as the reporter Jennifer Dugan in the 2007 film Spider-Man 3.

Gordon played the actress and singer Jane Birkin in a film biopic of singer-songwriter Serge Gainsbourg. The film, entitled Serge Gainsbourg, vie héroïque was presented at the 2009 Cannes Film Festival and was released in early 2010. Gordon's father, Richard Gordon said that she had loved playing her latest role in this film about Gainsbourg. The director Joann Sfar and the producers of the film Marc du Pontavice and Didier Lupfer released a statement that the film "owes a lot to the generosity, gentleness and immense talent of Lucy Gordon."

Death
On 20 May 2009, Gordon was found hanging in the Paris flat she shared with cinematographer Jérôme Alméras, just two days short of her 29th birthday. A French police official said she appeared to have committed suicide by hanging. She left two suicide notes, one detailing her last wishes regarding her estate, the other a letter for her parents.

She is buried at Brompton Cemetery, England.

Filmography

Film

Television

See also
List of suicides

References

External links

 
 Lucy Gordon at the Fashion Model Directory
 

1980 births
2009 deaths
20th-century English actresses
21st-century English actresses
Actresses from Oxfordshire
English emigrants to the United States
English expatriates in France
English female models
English film actresses
English television actresses
People educated at Oxford High School, England 
Actors from Oxford
2009 suicides
Suicides by hanging in France
Female suicides